Elections to Peterborough City Council took place on 2 May 2019. 20 of the 60 seats were contested. This was on the same day as other local elections across the United Kingdom.

Election summary

Summary

Following the election the Conservatives were able to continue to govern, although now in a minority administration with the support of the Werrington First group.

Ward results

Bretton

Central

Dogsthorpe

East

Eye, Thorney & Newborough

Fletton & Stanground

Fletton & Woodston

Glinton & Castor

Gunthorpe

Hampton Vale

Hargate & Hempsted

North

Orton Longueville
In July 2022, Councillor Skibsted resigned from the Labour Party to join the Green Party.

Orton Waterville

Park

Paston & Walton

Ravensthorpe

Stanground South

Werrington

West

References

2019
2019 English local elections
May 2019 events in the United Kingdom
2010s in Cambridgeshire